The following is a list of state highways in the U.S. state of Louisiana designated in the 1000–1049 range.


Louisiana Highway 1000

Louisiana Highway 1000 (LA 1000) runs  in an east–west direction from LA 996 south of Bruly St. Martin to LA 1 north of Paincourtville.

Louisiana Highway 1001

Louisiana Highway 1001 (LA 1001) runs  in a general southeast to northwest direction along Dugas Road from LA 1000 southeast of Bruly St. Martin to LA 996 at Bruly St. Martin.

Louisiana Highway 1002

Louisiana Highway 1002 (LA 1002) ran  in an east–west direction from LA 1000 to LA 1 north of Paincourtville.

Louisiana Highway 1003

Louisiana Highway 1003 (LA 1003) runs  in a general southwest to northeast direction from LA 70 north of Paincourtville to LA 1 in Klotzville.

Louisiana Highway 1004

Louisiana Highway 1004 (LA 1004) runs  in a north–south direction from LA 403 north of Brusle St. Vincent to LA 70 northwest of Paincourtville.

Louisiana Highway 1005

Louisiana Highway 1005 (LA 1005) runs  in a southwest to northeast direction from LA 1004 at Westfield to LA 1 in Paincourtville.

Louisiana Highway 1006

Louisiana Highway 1006 (LA 1006) runs  in a north–south direction from LA 401 southwest of Napoleonville to LA 402 east of Brusle St. Vincent.

Louisiana Highway 1007

Louisiana Highway 1007 (LA 1007) runs  in an east–west direction along Glenwood Road from LA 1006 at Glenwood to LA 1 north of Napoleonville.

Louisiana Highway 1008

Louisiana Highway 1008 (LA 1008) runs  in a southwest to northeast direction from LA 1006 east of Elm Hall to LA 308 east of Napoleonville.

Louisiana Highway 1009

Louisiana Highway 1009 (LA 1009) ran  in an east–west direction from the junction of two local roads at Cancienne to LA 1 south of Napoleonville.

Louisiana Highway 1010

Louisiana Highway 1010 (LA 1010) runs  in a general north–south direction from LA 398 south of Labadieville to LA 308 southeast of Napoleonville.

Louisiana Highway 1011

Louisiana Highway 1011 (LA 1011) runs  in a general east–west direction from LA 400 northeast of Attakapas Landing to LA 308 east of Supreme.

Louisiana Highway 1012

Louisiana Highway 1012 (LA 1012) runs  in a north–south direction from a dead end to a junction with LA 1011 west of Supreme.  The route's mileposts increase from the northern end contrary to common practice.

Louisiana Highway 1013

Louisiana Highway 1013 (LA 1013) runs  in an east–west direction from LA 398 at Brule Labadieville to a dead end east of Brule Labadieville.

Louisiana Highway 1014

Louisiana Highway 1014 (LA 1014) runs  in a southwest to northeast direction from LA 308 to a local road north of Labadieville.

Louisiana Highway 1015

Louisiana Highway 1015 (LA 1015) consists of two road segments with a total length of  that are located in the Assumption Parish community of Pierre Part.

LA 1015-1 runs  along Bay Road and North Bay Street from LA 70 to a point near Pierre Bay.
LA 1015-2 runs  along South Bay Road from LA 70 to a point near Pierre Bay.

Louisiana Highway 1016

Louisiana Highway 1016 (LA 1016) consists of two road segments with a total length of  that are located around the Assumption Parish community of Belle River.

LA 1016-1 runs  along Shell Beach Road from LA 70 to a point on Lake Verret.
LA 1016-2 runs  along Belle River Road from a point near Michel Road to a point beyond LA 70.

Louisiana Highway 1017

Louisiana Highway 1017 (LA 1017) runs  in a southeast to northwest direction from a point near Lake Louis to a junction with LA 8 in Sicily Island.  The route's mileposts increase from the northern end contrary to common practice.

Louisiana Highway 1018

Louisiana Highway 1018 (LA 1018) consists of two road segments with a total length of  that are located in the Catahoula Parish village of Harrisonburg.

LA 1018-1 runs  along Sicily Street from LA 124 (Brushley Street) to Catahoula Street.
LA 1018-2 runs  along Short Street from LA 8 (Pine Street) to LA 1018-1 (Sicily Street).

Louisiana Highway 1019

Louisiana Highway 1019 (LA 1019) runs  in a southwest to northeast direction from LA 64 north of Denham Springs to LA 63 east of Oldfield.  The route is bannered in all four cardinal directions with the signage changing from north–south to east–west at Watson.

Louisiana Highway 1020

Louisiana Highway 1020 (LA 1020) runs  in a north–south direction along Bend Road from LA 1019 west of Watson to a dead end near the Amite River northwest of Watson.

It is an undivided two-lane highway for its entire length.

Louisiana Highway 1021

Louisiana Highway 1021 (LA 1021) ran  in an east–west direction from LA 1019 to a point on Amite Church Road southwest of Watson.

Louisiana Highway 1022

Louisiana Highway 1022 (LA 1022) runs  in a southeast to northwest direction along Fore Road from LA 1019 to LA 16 northeast of Watson.

It is an undivided two-lane highway for its entire length.

Louisiana Highway 1023

Louisiana Highway 1023 (LA 1023) runs  in a north–south direction along Reinninger Road from LA 1019 west of Friendship to LA 63 east of Weiss.

It is an undivided two-lane highway for its entire length.

Louisiana Highway 1024

Louisiana Highway 1024 (LA 1024) runs  in a northwest to southeast direction from LA 1019 southwest of Watson to US 190 in Walker.

Louisiana Highway 1025

Louisiana Highway 1025 (LA 1025) runs  in an east–west direction along Arnold Road from LA 16 north of Denham Springs to LA 447 north of Walker.

It is an undivided two-lane highway for its entire length.

Louisiana Highway 1026

Louisiana Highway 1026 (LA 1026) runs  in a general north–south direction from LA 16 southeast of Denham Springs to the junction of LA 16 and LA 64 north of Denham Springs.

Louisiana Highway 1027

Louisiana Highway 1027 (LA 1027) runs  in an east–west direction along Burgess Avenue from the junction of US 190 and LA 1026 west of Walker to the Walker city limit. LA 1027 formerly extended further east on Burgess Avenue into Walker to LA 447, but this portion was deleted from the state highway system in 2017 as part of La DOTD's Road Transfer Program.

Louisiana Highway 1028

Louisiana Highway 1028 (LA 1028) runs  in a north–south direction along Old River Road from LA 16 to LA 64 north of Denham Springs.

The route is bannered east–west and is an undivided two-lane highway for its entire length.

Louisiana Highway 1029

Louisiana Highway 1029 (LA 1029) runs  in a southeast to northwest direction along Corbin Avenue from US 190 in Walker to LA 447 north of Walker.

It is an undivided two-lane highway for its entire length.

Louisiana Highway 1030

Louisiana Highway 1030 (LA 1030) runs  in a general north–south direction along Cockerham Road from the Denham Springs city limit to a junction with LA 1026 northeast of Denham Springs.  The route formerly extended further west along Cockerham Road into Denham Springs to LA 16, but this portion was deleted from the state highway system in 2017 as part of La DOTD's Road Transfer Program.

Louisiana Highway 1031

Louisiana Highway 1031 (LA 1031) runs  in a north–south direction along Hatchell Lane from the junction of US 190 and LA 16 to a junction with Cockerham Road in Denham Springs.

Louisiana Highway 1032

Louisiana Highway 1032 (LA 1032) runs  in a southeast to northwest direction from LA 16 northwest of Port Vincent to US 190 in Denham Springs.

Louisiana Highway 1033

Louisiana Highway 1033 (LA 1033) runs  in an east–west direction from LA 1032 to LA 16 northwest of Port Vincent.

It is an undivided two-lane highway for its entire length.

Louisiana Highway 1034

Louisiana Highway 1034 (LA 1034) runs  in an east–west direction along Vincent Road from LA 1032 to LA 16 south of Denham Springs.

It is an undivided two-lane highway from LA 1032 to LA 3002, at which it point it widens to four lanes with a center turn lane for the remainder of the route.

Louisiana Highway 1035

Louisiana Highway 1035 (LA 1035) consists of four road segments with a total length of  that are located in the Livingston Parish town of Livingston.

LA 1035-1 runs  along South Magnolia Street from a point south of Iowa Street to the concurrent US 190/LA 63 (Florida Boulevard).
LA 1035-2 runs  along South Poplar Street from a point south of Iowa Street to the concurrent US 190/LA 63 (Florida Boulevard).
LA 1035-3 runs  along Iowa Street from LA 1035-2 (South Poplar Street) to LA 1035-1 (South Magnolia Street).
LA 1035-4 runs  along Circle Drive from LA 1035-1 (South Magnolia Street) to US 190 (Florida Boulevard).

As of 2019, the portion of LA 1035-1 north of Ohio Street, the portion of LA 1035-2 north of Ohio Street, all of LA 1035-3, and all of LA 1035-4 are under agreement to be removed from the state highway system and transferred to local control.

Louisiana Highway 1036

Louisiana Highway 1036 (LA 1036) runs  in a north–south direction from LA 441 in Holden, Livingston Parish to a second junction with LA 441 in Montpelier, St. Helena Parish.

The route heads initially heads northwest from the unincorporated community of Holden.  After crossing the Tickfaw River, LA 1036 curves northward to an intersection with LA 441 between Magnolia and Starns.  The highway turns west concurrent with LA 441 for  then turns north again at Magnolia.   later, after having crossed from Livingston Parish into St. Helena Parish, LA 1036 turns east at a T-intersection with LA 1041 and proceeds to its terminus at LA 441 in the village of Montpelier.

Louisiana Highway 1037

Louisiana Highway 1037 (LA 1037) runs  in a general east–west direction from a point north of Tickfaw State Park to a point on the Natalbany River in Springfield.

Louisiana Highway 1038

Louisiana Highway 1038 (LA 1038) runs  in a northeast to southwest direction along Carter Cemetery Road from an intersection with a local road southwest of Springfield to a junction with the concurrent LA 22/LA 1037 inside the corporate limits.  The route is bannered east–west, and its mileposts increase from the eastern end contrary to common practice.

Louisiana Highway 1039

Louisiana Highway 1039 (LA 1039) runs  in a general north–south direction from a local road west of Denson to a junction with LA 22 east of Maurepas.  The route's mileposts increase from the northern end contrary to common practice.

LA 1039 heads east on Black Lake Club Road from a point near Easterly Lane and proceeds to the tiny community of Denson.  Here, the highway turns north onto Bear Island Road and continues to the junction with LA 22 near Maurepas.  LA 1039 is an undivided two-lane highway for its entire length.

Louisiana Highway 1040

Louisiana Highway 1040 (LA 1040) runs  in an east–west direction from LA 43 south of Albany to US 51 in Hammond.

The route begins at a point on LA 43 located just north of I-12 (exit 32) between Hungarian Settlement and Albany.  It heads east on Old Baton Rouge Highway, an undivided two-lane highway, and crosses the Natalbany River from Livingston Parish into Tangipahoa Parish.  A short distance later, LA 1040 intersects LA 1249 (Pumpkin Center Road), connecting to exit 35 on I-12 north of Pumpkin Center.  After curving to the northeast, LA 1040 crosses over without intersecting I-55, simultaneously entering the city of Hammond.  The route curves due east onto Chauvin Road, widening to accommodate a center turning lane, and terminates shortly afterward at a junction with US 51 (South Morrison Boulevard).  A local road known as Corbin Road continues the path of Chauvin Road eastward.

In the pre-1955 state highway system, LA 1040 was designated as State Route 7-D.  It was a portion of the original alignment of the concurrent US 190 and State Route 7 bypassed in 1929. The route became LA 1040 in the 1955 Louisiana Highway renumbering and has remained largely the same to the present day apart from a small realignment on its eastern end. LA 1040 originally followed the entirety of Old Baton Rouge Highway to its intersection with US 51. In 2009, LA 1040 was diverted onto Chauvin Road, a newly improved local road, which moved the highway's eastern terminus away from the US 51/US 190 junction.

Louisiana Highway 1041

Louisiana Highway 1041 (LA 1041) runs  in a northwest to southeast direction from the junction of LA 16 and LA 449 in Pine Grove to LA 1036 west of Montpelier.

It is an undivided two-lane highway for its entire length.

Louisiana Highway 1042

Louisiana Highway 1042 (LA 1042) runs  in an east–west direction from Parish Road 1042 west of Greensburg to LA 37 in Greensburg.  The route's mileposts increase from the eastern end contrary to common practice.

Louisiana Highway 1043

Louisiana Highway 1043 (LA 1043) runs  in a southwest to northeast direction from LA 10 east of Darlington to LA 43 at Liverpool.  The route is bannered north–south.

Louisiana Highway 1044

Louisiana Highway 1044 (LA 1044) runs  in a north–south direction from LA 432 in Chipola to the Mississippi state line north of Chipola.

Louisiana Highway 1045

Louisiana Highway 1045 (LA 1045) runs  in an east–west direction from LA 43 south of Greensburg, St. Helena Parish to LA 16 west of Amite City, Tangipahoa Parish.

Louisiana Highway 1046

Louisiana Highway 1046 (LA 1046) runs  in a northwest to southeast direction from LA 441 north of Hillsdale, St. Helena Parish to LA 1045 west of Amite City, Tangipahoa Parish.

Louisiana Highway 1047

Louisiana Highway 1047 (LA 1047) runs  in a northwest to southeast direction from LA 441 southeast of Greensburg to LA 1046 at Kedron.

It is an undivided two-lane highway for its entire length.

Louisiana Highway 1048

Louisiana Highway 1048 (LA 1048) runs  in an east–west direction from LA 1047 southeast of Greensburg, St. Helena Parish to the concurrent US 51/LA 10 north of Roseland, Tangipahoa Parish.

The route heads southeast from LA 1047 and crosses from St. Helena Parish into Tangipahoa Parish.  Now heading eastward, LA 1048 passes through a diamond interchange with I-55 (exit 50), connecting with Hammond, Louisiana to the south and Jackson, Mississippi to the north.  The highway proceeds a short distance further to a T-intersection with US 51/LA 10 at Arcola, a point just north of Roseland.

Louisiana Highway 1049

Louisiana Highway 1049 (LA 1049) runs  in a southwest to northeast direction from LA 440 west of Tangipahoa to LA 38 in Kentwood, Tangipahoa Parish.

LA 1049 initially heads north along the St. Helena Parish line then curves to the northeast and crosses LA 1050.  The highway enters the Kentwood city limits on Collis B. Temple Sr. Road, passing under without intersecting I-55.  It then turns north onto 9th Street at LA 1051 and proceeds a short distance to its terminus at LA 38 (Avenue G).  LA 1049 is an undivided two-lane highway for its entire length.

See also

References

External links
Maps / GIS Data Homepage, Louisiana Department of Transportation and Development